The Royal Compound is a complex of residences built with the personal funds of King Alexander I for the Karađorđević royal family between 1924 and 1937. The compound is located in the Dedinje neighborhood, a prestigious area of Belgrade, Serbia. It consists of two primary residences: the Royal Palace and the White Palace.

The Royal Compound covers an area of 134 hectares, of which 27 hectares surround the Royal Palace and another 12 hectares the White Palace. The service buildings include kitchens, garages, guards barracks and the office of the Marshal.

Parks and gardens

The Royal Compound is covered with parks of the English garden type, where the vegetation is allowed to grow naturally, whereas around the two palaces the French garden concept of park arrangement is applied, meaning that flowers, bushes and trees have neatly shaped forms and are planted in strictly geometrical order.

Thatched House
The Thatched House (Slamnata kuća) is a structure built in the style of old traditional houses. King Alexander I of Yugoslavia used to reside in this house supervising the construction works at the Royal Compound, and it also served as the studying room for King Alexander’s three sons (later King Peter II, Prince Tomislav, Prince Andrej) and the art studio of Queen Maria.

Royal Palace
The Royal Palace is a grand stucco villa in the Serbo-Byzantine style by architect Živojin Nikolić and assisted by Russian immigrant architects Nikolai Krasnov and Victor Lukomsky, was built from 1924 to 1929 as an ideal home for King Alexander I and Queen Maria. The King thought that it would be a nice and quiet place, away from the city noise and curious public eyes.

Visitors are able to see: The formal entrance hall with details taken from Serbian medieval art, Blue Salon, Royal Dining Room, Royal Library, Atrium, the Salon of the Wedding Gifts or Palma il Vecchio Salon – and The King’s Office. The palace's basement features a unique leisure room with a cinema theatre and billiard tables.

White Palace

It is another Palace within the Royal Compound.

The White Palace (Beli Dvor) is located within the same Royal Compound in Dedinje as the Royal Palace and it was commissioned by command of His Majesty King Alexander I. The White Palace was built with the private funds of King Alexander I as the residence for his three sons HRH Crown Prince Peter (the future King Peter II and father of HRH Crown Prince Alexander), Prince Tomislav and Prince Andrej .

Royal Chapel

the Royal Chapel, which is located within the Royal Compound, is devoted to Saint Apostle Andrew The First-Called, the patron Saint of the Royal Family of Yugoslavia. The church was built at the same time as the Royal Palace and is attached to it through a colonnade with semicircular arches from where there are magnificent views towards northern, western and southern parts of Belgrade, as well as to the terraced rose gardens. It is covered with frescoes painted by Russian painters who travelled around Serbia and copied the frescoes of the most famous Serbian medieval monasteries. The final decoration was chosen personally by King Alexander I with help from the architect Nikolai Krasnov. During the Communist era, the church was repeatedly desecrated, it served as a storage room for cleaners and gardeners. One of the most obvious signs of desecration is a bullet hole in Christ’s forehead and a scratch of the Angel’s wings, representing the communist symbolic "murder of God". The church is today used by the Royal Family, especially during Easter, Christmas, and Slava (patron saint day).

The Royal Compound, which many still wrongly call "Beli dvor" because it associates them with Josip Broz Tito, is now the home of Crown Prince Alexander of Yugoslavia and his family.

The Royal Compound opened its doors for the Days of European Cultural Heritage event and has participated at tourist fairs.

References

External links

 
 The Mausoleum of the Royal Family

Palaces in Serbia
Royal residences in Serbia
Buildings and structures in Belgrade
Kingdom of Yugoslavia
1920s establishments in Serbia
Savski Venac